Pseudosphromenus is a genus of medium-small gouramies native to south and southeast Asia.

Species
There are currently 2 recognized species in this genus:
 Pseudosphromenus cupanus (G. Cuvier, 1831) (Spiketail paradisefish)
 Pseudosphromenus dayi (Köhler, 1908)

References

 
Macropodusinae
Freshwater fish genera
Taxa named by Pieter Bleeker